The Women's football tournament at the 2010 Asian Games was held in Guangzhou in China from 8 November to 25 November.

Squads

Results
All times are China Standard Time (UTC+08:00)

Pool matches

Group A

 Both teams ended the group stage with equal points, goal difference and goal scored. A penalty shootout was therefore taken immediately after the 90-minute match to determine the group winner in which South Korea won.

Group B

Knockout round

Semifinals

Bronze medal match

Final

Goalscorers

Final standing

References
Results on RSSSF

External links
Official website

Women